Howard West Kilvinton Mowll (1890–1958) was the Anglican Bishop of Western China from 1925 to 1933, and Archbishop of Sydney from 1933 until his death in 1958.

Biography 
Mowll was born in Dover and attended Dover College until 1903 and later matriculated at the King's School, Canterbury.

As a staunch evangelical, upon returning from the mission field of Western China (Sichuan), Mowll experienced early difficulties in a predominantly liberal church before rising to national prominence during the war years. In 1947 he was elected Primate of Australia.

Within a month of World War 2 starting he had formed the Church of England National Emergency Fund, or CENEF, which was supported with volunteers and fundraising by the Sydney Diocesan Churchwomen's Association. CENEF funded huts for recreation and chaplains in military camps around Sydney, as well as at St Andrew's Cathedral, Sydney and other churches around Sydney. To continue to help ex service people after the war and youth work, CENEF raised funds to buy 201 Castlereagh St Sydney, and Rathane in the Royal National Park. CENEF leveraged the Castlereagh st building to buy land at Gilbulla and 117 acres in Castle Hill for a retirement village. This retirement village was one of his great achievements (some say his wife Dorothy was the driving force behind the idea), and became the first retirement village in Australia. Today this site remains the flagship for Anglican Retirement Villages, Diocese of Sydney. In 1947, following the War, he was elected Primate of Australia.

See also 
 Anglican Diocese of Sydney
 Anglicanism in Sichuan

Notes

External links

1890 births
1958 deaths
People educated at The King's School, Canterbury
Anglican archbishops of Sydney
Primates of the Anglican Church of Australia
Anglican missionaries in Sichuan
Anglican missionary bishops in China
Evangelical Anglican bishops
20th-century Anglican bishops in China
Diocese of Szechwan
Anglican bishops of Western China